Muhammad Khairul Nizam bin Mohammad Kamal (born 25 June 1991) is a Singaporean professional footballer who plays as a forward for Singapore Premier League side Tanjong Pagar United and the Singapore national team.

He was first spotted when he was playing for his alma mater Serangoon Secondary School where he won the Golden Boot Award in the 2007 National ‘B’ Division Football Championship, scoring all of his nine goals from open play. He went on to represent an adidas squad from Singapore that played in a regional football tournament in Hong Kong later that year.

Club career

Young Lions 
Nizam began his professional football career with Under-23 side Young Lions in the S.League in 2009. He was one of the Young Lions players involved in an on-pitch fight with Beijing Guoan Talent players in their S.League match on 7 September 2010. He was charged by the Football Association of Singapore for gross misconduct and bringing the game into disrepute; he was banned for eight months and fined S$2,000 for his part in the brawl.

LionsXII
In December 2011, the FAS announced that Nizam was to join the newly formed LionsXII for the 2012 Malaysia Super League.

A catalogue of injuries over three years limited him to just 20 games between 2012 and 2014. 2015 would prove to be a better year as Nizam featured 14 times in the Malaysian Super League for the LionsXII and scored three goals.

Home United
In 2016, Nizam signed for Home United. He scored his first goal for Home United on his debut in the opening match of the 2016 season against Warriors in the Uniform Derby. However, injuries continued to curtail his career, with Nizam having gone through three knee surgeries since 2012 to repair his anterior cruciate ligament and meniscus. Nizam was eventually ruled out of the year end 2016 AFF Championship for the national team.

He scored his first goal for the 2017 S.League season in a 6-1 dismantling of Garena Young Lions in Home's first league game of the season. Subsequently, in just three starts and two substitute appearances at the start of 2017 for Home, he has racked up a goal and four assists, which led to a national recall. In total, he racked up 8 goals in all competitions for the protectors in 2017.

Warriors FC 
For the 2018 S.League season, Nizam moved to Warriors FC after rejecting a contract extension at Home United.

International career
Nizam was first called up to the Singapore senior squad in 2009 but did not feature against Thailand.
He made his first international debut in a friendly match against Poland on 23 January 2010, replacing Faris Ramli in the 46th minute. Although earmarked as Singapore's next big thing, he has yet to find the back of the net for the Lions after 16 appearances. In his next two games for the Lions, against Afghanistan and Bahrain, Nizam found himself with opportunities to score in both games but somehow managed to miss them, leaving him still waiting to open his account after 18 caps.

Others

Singapore Selection Squad
Nizam was selected as part of the Singapore Selection squad for The Sultan of Selangor’s Cup to be held on 6 May 2017.

Career statistics

Club

. Caps and goals may be incorrect.

 Young Lions and LionsXII are ineligible for qualification to AFC competitions in their respective leagues.
 Young Lions withdrew from the 2011 and 2012 Singapore Cup, and the 2011 Singapore League Cup due to participation in AFC and AFF youth competitions.

Personal life
Khairul Nizam is the younger brother of forward Khairul Amri, and both have previously played alongside each other at LionsXII.

Honours

Club 
LionsXII
Malaysia Super League: 2013
FA Cup Malaysia: 2015

References

1991 births
Living people
Singaporean footballers
Singapore international footballers
Singapore Premier League players
LionsXII players
Singaporean people of Malay descent
Association football forwards
Malaysia Super League players
Young Lions FC players
Footballers at the 2014 Asian Games
Southeast Asian Games bronze medalists for Singapore
Southeast Asian Games medalists in football
Competitors at the 2009 Southeast Asian Games
Asian Games competitors for Singapore